Dactylopus is a genus of dragonets native to the western Pacific Ocean.

Species
There are currently two recognized species in this genus:
 Dactylopus dactylopus (Valenciennes, 1837) (Fingered dragonet)
 Dactylopus kuiteri (R. Fricke, 1992) (Orange-black dragonet)

References

 
Marine fish genera
Taxa named by Theodore Gill